Buldam is a former Pomo settlement in Mendocino County, California. It was located on the north bank of Big River, near the mouth of the river and east of the present town of Mendocino; its precise location is unknown. Following the standard conventions of the Pomo people, in which a community of the Pomo was named by adding "-pomo" to the name of their principal site, the community at Buldam was called Buldam-pomo.

According to some Pomo sources, it was founded in around 1851 by people from the Mitom Pomo who had been driven out of Nabo and other inland valley settlements by European settlers. Its founding sparked a war between the Mitom Pomo and the Pomo from Point Arena, possibly over ownership of the area.

A different story about the cause of war between the Point Arena Pomo and the Buldam Pomo involves an incident in which one of the Point Arena Pomo was poisoned.

References

Former settlements in Mendocino County, California
Former populated places in California
Lost Native American populated places in the United States
Pomo villages